Anulap is a god of magic and knowledge in the Truk Island mythology of Micronesia (Truk), who teaches these things to humanity.  He is the husband of the creator goddess Ligobubfanu, and may be a creator deity himself. His son was Lugeilan, and his grandson was Olifat.

Micronesian deities
Creator gods
Knowledge gods
Magic gods